The Siddhartha School is a school in the village of Stok in Ladakh, India.

Founded in 1995 by the Tibetan lama Khen Rinpoche Lobzang Tsetan with 25 students in a one-room shed, the school is now a private school with over 415 students in grades K-10. No child is denied admission on the basis of financial need. Students at Siddhartha School learn four languages: Ladakhi, Tibetan, Hindi, and English. In addition, their studies include math, sciences, computer science, civics, music, and physical education.

When the school opened, just under 10% of all students taking the Class 10 Indian Standard Exam in the state of Jammu and Kashmir, where the school is located, passed.  By the year 2010 that figure had risen to 24.8%.

External links

Private schools in Jammu and Kashmir
1995 establishments in Jammu and Kashmir
Educational institutions established in 1995